Accrosport may refer to:

 Acro Sport I and Acro Sport II, a type of aerobatic sports aeroplane
 Ovo (Cirque du Soleil), a dance sequence
 A range of athletic or sports activities including:
 A human pyramid
 A Castell
 A Human tower (gymnastic formation)